Straupe is a village in Straupe Parish, Cēsis Municipality in the Vidzeme region of Latvia.

History
Before the village was founded, the area was a part of the ancient Idumea country.  The village of Straupe began to develop around the Lielstraupe Castle in the 14th century.  Later became the trade center known in German as Roop, and received its town privileges in 1374. During the fourteenth century, Straupe flourished as part of the mercantile Hanseatic League. The town was destroyed during the Polish–Swedish War (1600–29).

Origin of name 
It is possible that Straupe name comes from the Livonian language word raupa, meaning "running water."

See also
 Lielstraupe Castle

References

External links
  Municipal website
  Tourist information and the map of Straupe area
  The coin "Straupe" issued within the international coin programme "Hansa Cities" (2006)
 

Members of the Hanseatic League
Kreis Wolmar
Towns and villages in Latvia
Populated places established in the 14th century
Cēsis Municipality
Vidzeme